The Starfire Firebolt, sometimes called the Starfire Firebolt Convertible, due to its removable canopy, is an American homebuilt aerobatic biplane that was designed by G. H. "Mac" McKenzie and produced by Starfire Aviation of Tempe, Arizona. When it was available the aircraft was supplied in the form of plans for amateur construction, with some pre-fabricated parts available.

Design and development
The Firebolt was developed from the Steen Skybolt and features a biplane layout with interplane struts, cabane struts and flying wires, a two-seats-in-tandem open, or optionally, enclosed cockpit under a bubble canopy that slides back, fixed conventional landing gear with wheel pants and a single engine in tractor configuration.

The aircraft is made of mixed construction, with a welded steel tubing, aluminum and wooden structure, all covered in doped aircraft fabric.

The manufacturer estimated the construction time from the supplied plans as 3000 hours.

Operational history
By 1998 the company reported that six aircraft were completed and flying.

In March 2014 eight examples were registered in the United States with the Federal Aviation Administration, although a total of nine had been registered at one time.

Specifications (Firebolt)

See also
List of aerobatic aircraft

References

External links
 Photo of a Firebolt

Firebolt
1990s United States sport aircraft
Single-engined tractor aircraft
Biplanes
Homebuilt aircraft
Aerobatic aircraft